Buttigliera Alta is a town and comune   in the Metropolitan City of Turin about  from Turin in the Susa valley in Piedmont, northern Italy. It is not far to Avigliana, of which it once was a part.

History
It first became an autonomous fief in 1619 when Giovanni Carron received the fiefs of Buttigliera, Uriola, and Case Nicola - as well as the title of Count - from Duke Charles Emmanuel I of Savoy.

From that point in time the history of Buttigliera was intimately tied with the history of the Carron family. The last member of the family, Clementina Carron, died in April 1912.

In the 20th century, the FIAT group established one of its metallurgical factories in Ferriera, a frazione of Buttigliera Alta.

Main sights

The nearby Sacra di San Michele. It is located at the entrance to the Susa Valley.
The preceptory of Sant'Antonio di Ranverso.

Twin towns
 Jougne, France

References

External links
Official website

Cities and towns in Piedmont